Hokus pokus, Alfons Åberg! is a 1987 children's book by Gunilla Bergström. In 2013, it was made into an animated film.

References

1987 children's books
Rabén & Sjögren books
Works by Gunilla Bergström